Christoph Kröpfl (born 4 May 1990) is an Austrian footballer who plays as a midfielder for FC Marchfeld Donauauen in the Austrian Regionalliga East.

Club career
Born in Graz, Kröpfl started playing football with the ESV Austria Graz. Later he joined the Sturm Graz Akademie to make his professional debut for SK Sturm Graz in the 2007/2008 season against SV Ried. In summer 2009 he joined FC Red Bull Salzburg. There he plays for the second Team, Salzburg Juniors, at first. In December 2009 he gave his debut in the first squad playing versus FC Kärnten, where he came in minute 63 for Somen Tchoyi.

Since 2010 he is on loan in Kapfenberg playing for SV Kapfenberg.

He played for the youth Austrian national team from U-16 to U-21.

References

1990 births
Living people
Footballers from Graz
Association football midfielders
Austrian footballers
Austria youth international footballers
Austria under-21 international footballers
SK Sturm Graz players
FC Red Bull Salzburg players
Kapfenberger SV players
TSV Hartberg players
SV Lafnitz players
Austrian Football Bundesliga players
2. Liga (Austria) players
Austrian Regionalliga players